The McNally Robinson Book of the Year Award is associated with the Manitoba Book Awards and was established in 1988. It is presented to the Manitoba writer whose adult English language book is judged the best written. The author receives a cash award of $5,000, donated by McNally Robinson Booksellers.

Winners

External links
The McNally Robinson Book of the Year Award
Manitoba Book Awards

Canadian literary awards
Manitoba awards
Awards established in 1988
1988 establishments in Manitoba